Günther Lüders (5 March 1905 – 1 March 1975) was a German actor. He appeared in more than 120 films between 1934 and 1975.  He lived in Urfeld am Walchensee from 1954 until 1975.

Selected filmography

 Count Woronzeff (1934), as Cousin Boris
 Hearts are Trumps (1934), as Jonny Adriani
 Game on Board (1936), as Seaman
 The Island (1934)
 Miss Liselott (1934)
 Der Etappenhase (1937), as Pvt. Hein Lammers
 Alarm in Peking (1937), as Corporal Lüdecke
 Autobus S (1937), as Gustav Bauer
 A Girl Goes Ashore (1938), as Krischan
 Wibbel the Tailor (1939), as Tailor journeyman Peter Zimpel / Heinz Zimpel
 Men Are That Way (1939)
 Wunschkonzert (1940), as Zimmermann
 Love Me (1942)
 Geheimakte W.B.1 (1942), as Shipbuilder Karl Hösly
 A Man for My Wife (1943), as Fritz Olden
 Marriage of Affection (1944), as Lothar Manning
 Große Freiheit Nr. 7 (1944), as Jens
 The Time with You (1948)
 The Day Before the Wedding (1952), as Weber
 A Heart Plays False (1952), as Kersten
 Father Needs a Wife (1952)
 Scandal at the Girls' School (1953)
 The Bird Seller (1953)
 His Royal Highness (1953), as Butler Neumann
 Must We Get Divorced? (1953)
 The Country Schoolmaster (1954), as Vicar Sunneby
 Love is Forever (1954), as Ploetz
 The Sinful Village (1954), as Christian Süßbier
 The Perfect Couple (1954)
 Three Men in the Snow (1955), as Butler Johann Kesselhut
 The Happy Village (1955), as Hinnerk
 The False Adam (1955)
 Father's Day (1955), as Franz Novotny
 Roses in Autumn (1955), as Alonzo Gieshübler
 If We All Were Angels (1956, director)
 All Roads Lead Home (1957)
 The Girl and the Legend (1957), as Mr. Drinkwater
  (1957), as August Bodendiek
  (1957, director)
 A Piece of Heaven (1957), as Kellner
 The Spessart Inn (1958), as Baron Eberhard Sperling
 Thirteen Old Donkeys (1958), as Vicar
  (1958, director)
 The Buddenbrooks (1959), as Corle Smolt
 Crime Tango (1960), as Uncle Albert
 I'm an Elephant, Madame (1969), as Dr. Hartmann

References

External links

1905 births
1975 deaths
German male film actors
20th-century German male actors
Actors from Lübeck